was a karate master (soke) of Okinawa.

He was born in the closing years of the Ryūkyū Kingdom to the Ryūkyū family, and he was the 4th head of the Yoshimura Udun. He was the second son of Yoshimura Chōmei. His mother was the eldest daughter of Prince Ie Chōchoku. In addition, Chōgi was the cousin of Motobu Chōki of the Motobu Udun. He was born to such a noble family that he had opportunities to learn karate from many famous masters. He learned Shuri-te from Matsumura Sōkon, and Naha-te from Higaonna Kanryō.  

In his later years, he moved to Tokyo and Osaka, where he lived the lifestyle of a literary person, enjoying Bōjutsu, Kenjutsu, calligraphy and painting. On March 14, 1945 (Shōwa 20), he died in Osaka during an air raid. His age of death was 80 years.

In 1979 (Shōwa 54), paintings and calligraphic works of Chōgi were donated by his bereaved family to the Okinawa Prefectural Museum, and in 1981 (Shōwa 56), the museum held the “Yoshimura Chōgi Exhibition.”

References

1866 births
1945 deaths
Okinawan male karateka
People of the Ryukyu Kingdom
19th-century Ryukyuan people
People of Meiji-period Japan
People from Okinawa Prefecture
Japanese civilians killed in World War II
Deaths by airstrike during World War II